Big Noise or The Big Noise may refer to:

Comics
Superman/Batman: Big Noise, a comic book by Joe Casey

Film and TV
 The Big Noise (1928 film), an American comedy film directed by Allan Dwan
 The Big Noise (1936 American film), a 1936 United States film directed by Frank McDonald 
 The Big Noise (1936 British film), a British comedy film directed by Alex Bryce
 The Big Noise (1944 film), a 1944 American comedy film starring Laurel and Hardy
 The Big Noise (2012 film), an Australian film

Music

Albums
Big Noise, album by Man from Delmonte (band) 2000
Big Noise, album by Eddie from Ohio 1997
Wynonna & the Big Noise, by  Wynonna Judd  2016
 Big Noise (Tiny Masters of Today EP), a 2006 EP by Tiny Masters of Today
Big Noise from Winnetka, album by Bob Haggart 1962

Songs
"Big Noise", song by The Upsetters from The Upsetter  1969 and compilation Return of Django The Best of the Upsetters	2002
"Big Noise", song by Phil Collins from Buster OST 1988, and album Groovy Kind of Love 1991